The Roman Catholic Diocese of Ciudad Real is a diocese located in the city of Ciudad Real in the Ecclesiastical province of Toledo in Spain.

History
 18 November 1875: Established as Territorial Prelature of Ciudad Real for the Grand Prior of the Royal United Military Spanish Orders (Order of Santiago, Order of Alcantara, Order of Calatrava and Order of Montesa)
 4 February 1980: Promoted as Diocese of Ciudad Real (the Bishop maintains also the title of Grand Prior)

Leadership
 Prelates of Ciudad Real (Roman rite) 
Victoriano Guisasola y Rodríguez (28 May 1877 – 27 Mar 1882 ) 
Antonio María Cascajares y Azara  (27 Mar 1882 – 27 Mar 1884 ) 
José María Rancés y Villanueva † (10 Jun 1886 – 28 Nov 1898) 
Casimiro Piñera y Naredo † (28 Nov 1898 – 28 Aug 1904 Died) 
Remigio Gandásegui y Gorrochátegui (27 Mar 1905 – 28 May 1914 ) 
Francisco Javier de Irastorza Loinaz (11 Jul 1914 – 27 Jun 1922 ) 
Bl. Narciso de Esténaga y Echevarría (14 Dec 1922 – 22 Aug 1936) 
Emeterio Echeverria Barrena (29 Dec 1942 – 25 Dec 1954 Died) 
Juan Hervás y Benet (14 Mar 1955 – 30 Sep 1976 ) 
 Bishops of Ciudad Real (Roman rite)
Rafael Torija de la Fuente (30 Sep 1976 – 20 Mar 2003) 
Antonio Ángel Algora Hernando (20 Mar 2003 – 8 Apr 2016)
Gerardo Melgar Viciosa (8 April 2016 – )

See also
Roman Catholicism in Spain

References

External links
 GCatholic.org
 Catholic Hierarchy 
 Diocese website

Roman Catholic dioceses in Spain
Religious organizations established in 1875
Roman Catholic dioceses and prelatures established in the 19th century